This article is about the list of Clube Recreativo e Desportivo do Libolo players. Clube Recreativo e Desportivo do Libolo is an Angolan football (soccer) club based in Calulo, Angola and plays at the Estádio Patrice Lumumba.  The club was established in 1942.

2020–2021
C.R.D. Libolo players 2020–2021

2011–2020
C.R.D. Libolo players 2011–2020

2006–2010
C.R.D. Libolo players 2006–2010

External links
  
 Girabola.com profile
 Zerozero.pt profile
 Facebook profile
 Soccerway profile

References

Recreativo Libolo
C.R.D. Libolo players
Association football player non-biographical articles